Thatta is a city in Sindh, Pakistan.

Thatta may also refer to:
Thatta District, an administrative unit of Sindh, Pakistan
Thatta, Attock, a town in Punjab, Pakistan
Thatta Jhamb, a village in Punjab, Pakistan
Thatta, Sultanpur Lodhi, a village in Punjab, India

See also

Thattamala, a neighbourhood in Kollam, India